Alfredo Rizzo (2 January 1902 – 6 September 1991) was an Italian actor, screenwriter and director.

Life and career 
Born in Nice, France into a family of actors, Rizzo started his career as an actor of avanspettacolo and revue, often alongside his brother Carlo. After his debut on the big screen in 1939, in the aftermath of the Second World War he had an intense and long film career, being mostly cast in the role of "villain". Later, he also wrote and directed a number of films, mostly of erotic genre, sometimes credited as Fred Ritz.

Selected filmography 
 Actor

 Lo vedi come sei... lo vedi come sei? (1939) - L'uomo della mosca di piatto (uncredited)
 Macario Against Zagomar (1944)
 L'Amante del male (1946) - Il giudice Forlenza
 Lost in the Dark (1947)
Fire Over the Sea (1947) - Barbiere in Argentina
 Sono io l'assassino (1948)
 I contrabbandieri del mare (1948)
 The Firemen of Viggiù (1949) - Fireman from Milan
 Vivere a sbafo (1949)
 How I Discovered America (1949) - Nazista
 I cadetti di Guascogna (1950)
 La paura fa 90 (1951) - Il suggeritore
 Quo Vadis (1951) - Hairdresser (uncredited)
 Una bruna indiavolata! (1951) - Finto Testimone
 Auguri e figli maschi! (1951) - Clerk at Vinicio Paciottini's Office (uncredited)
 Papà diventa mamma (1952)
 In Olden Days (1952) - (segment "Il processo di Frine") (uncredited)
 Heroic Charge (1952) - The Colonel
 Il romanzo della mia vita (1952) - The Thief with a Hat
 Io, Amleto (1952) - Cliente sordo nella taverna
 The Piano Tuner Has Arrived (1952)
 The Passaguai Family Gets Rich (1952)
 Siamo tutti inquilini (1953) - Inquilino (uncredited)
 Roman Holiday (1953) - Taxicab Driver
 Anni facili (1953)
 Bread, Love and Dreams (1953) - Brigadiere Squinzi
 Crossed Swords (1954)
 I cavalieri della regina (1954)
 Milanese in Naples (1954) - Alfredo
 Assi alla ribalta (1954)
 War and Peace (1956) - Soldier (uncredited)
 Interpol (1957) - Abbata (uncredited)
 Sorrisi e canzoni (1958)
 Terror of Oklahoma (1959) - Sheriff
 I baccanali di Tiberio (1960)
 La Dolce Vita (1960) - Television Director (uncredited)
 The Playgirls and the Vampire (1960) - Lucas, the manager
 Caravan petrol (1960)
 A Qualcuna Piace Calvo (1960) - Agente
 Boccaccio '70 (1962) - Foreman (uncredited)
 Il segno del vendicatore (1962) - Frate Giovanni
 Gli anni ruggenti (1962)
 Il criminale (1962) - Signore pignolo
 Duel at the Rio Grande (1963) - Sirviente
 Vino, whisky e acqua salata (1963)
 Giacobbe, l'uomo che lottò con Dio (1963)
 Una sporca faccenda (1964)
 La strage dei vampiri (1964)
 Two Mafiamen in the Far West (1964) - Colonel Peabody
 Le sette vipere (Il marito latino) (1964) - Italian Judge
 I due evasi di Sing Sing (1964) - Sauna Director (uncredited)
 Gli schiavi più forti del mondo (1964) - Efrem
 La traite des blanches (1965)
 Terror-Creatures from the Grave (1965) - Dr. Nemek
 Blood for a Silver Dollar (1965) - Buddy
 Colorado Charlie (1965) - Sam, Drunk
 Per una manciata d'oro (1965) - Medico
 La vedovella (1965) - Carlo Sardelli
 Bloody Pit of Horror (1965) - Daniel Parks
 Go with God, Gringo (1966) - Ayudante del inspector
 I due sanculotti (1966) - 'Linguaveloce' (uncredited)
 7 monaci d'oro (1966)
 Born to Kill (1967) - Crooked gambler
 Non Pensare a Me (Não Pense em Mim) (1967)
 Don't Wait, Django... Shoot! (1967) - Nico
 Cuore matto... matto da legare (1967)
 Brutti di notte (1968) - Dr. Federzotti - the Psychoanalyst
 Vengeance Is My Forgiveness (1968) - Peter, Piano Player
 Spirits of the Dead (1968) - Angry Man in Car (segment "Toby Dammit") (uncredited)
 Don Chisciotte and Sancio Panza (1968) - Governor doctor
 I 2 deputati (1968) - Dott. Lucarini
 Fellini Satyricon (1969) - The Innkeeper
 Agguato sul Bosforo (1969) - Martin
 Three (1969) - Waiter
 Puro siccome un angelo papà mi fece monaco... di Monza (1969)
 Paths of War (1970) - Sergeant Douglas
 Un caso di coscienza (1970) - Club president
 Don Franco e Don Ciccio nell'anno della contestazione (1970) - Veterinario
 Quando suona la campana (1970) - Moreno
 La prima notte del dottor Danieli, industriale, col complesso del... giocattolo (1970) - Federico
 Principe coronato cercasi per ricca ereditiera (1970) - Luigi Fisichella
 Due bianchi nell'Africa nera (1970) - Otto Krauser
 Mazzabubù... quante corna stanno quaggiù? (1971) - The anti-divorce Orator
 I giardini del diavolo (1971) - General
 Venga a fare il soldato da noi (1971) - Pizzuti
 Il venditore di morte (1971) - Judge Atwell
 Paid in Blood (1971) - Jack Buchanan / Buck
 Holy Water Joe (1971) - Captain
 Le belve (1971) - Dott. Apposito (segment "Il caso Apposito")
 God Is My Colt .45 (1972) - Ted Curtis (uncredited)
 Confessioni segrete di un convento di clausura (1972) - Prior
 Sistemo l'America e torno (1974) - Alex Biondi
 SS Hell Camp (1977) - Allied Officer (uncredited)
 La bestia in calore (1977) - Moreno (uncredited)
 Amore all'arrabbiata (1977) - Ingegner Giovanni
 Little Italy (1978) - Old Bald Man (uncredited)
 Uno contro l'altro, praticamente amici (1981) - Avv. Randolfi
 Crime at the Chinese Restaurant (1981) - Papetti's lover's husband
 Il diavolo e l'acquasanta (1983) - Sindaco

 Director and screenwriter
Heroes without glory (1971)
 The Bloodsucker Leads the Dance (1975)
 Suggestionata (1978)

References

External links 
 

1902 births
1991 deaths
Italian male film actors
Italian male television actors
Italian male stage actors
Male actors from Nice, France
20th-century Italian male actors
20th-century Italian writers
20th-century Italian male writers
Italian film directors